Radu Albot and Enrique López-Pérez won the title, beating Franko Škugor and Adrian Ungur 6–4, 6–1

Seeds

Draw

Draw

References
 Doubles Draw

San Marino GOandFUN Open - Doubles
San Marino GO&FUN Open